Viguierella is a genus of Madagascan plants in the grass family. The only known species is Viguierella madagascariensis.

References

Chloridoideae
Endemic flora of Madagascar
Grasses of Africa
Monotypic Poaceae genera
Taxa named by Aimée Antoinette Camus